Molokovo is a rural locality (a village) in Pyatovskoye Rural Settlement, Totemsky District, Vologda Oblast, Russia. The population was 6 as of 2002.

Geography 
Molokovo is located 7 km northwest of Totma (the district's administrative centre) by road. Ivoylovo is the nearest rural locality.

References 

Rural localities in Totemsky District